Basidioradulum is a genus of corticioid fungi in the family Schizoporaceae. It was circumscribed by Canadian mycologist Mildred Katherine Nobles in 1967. The type species B. radula was formerly in Hydnum.

References

External links

Hymenochaetales
Agaricomycetes genera